TKP may stand for:

 Communist Party of Turkey (disambiguation) (Türkiye Komünist Partisi), various entities
 Takapoto Airport (IATA-code)
 Tikopia language (ISO 639 alpha-3, tkp)